Anantapur, officially Anantapuramu, is a city in Anantapur district of the Indian state of Andhra Pradesh. It is the mandal headquarters of Anantapuru mandal and also the divisional headquarters of Anantapur revenue division. The city is located on National Highway. It was also the headquarters of the Datta Mandalam (Rayalaseema districts of Andhra Pradesh and Bellary district of Karnataka) in 1799. It was also a position of strategic importance for the British Indian Army during the Second World War.

Geography 
It is located at a distance of 484 km from Vijayawada, 148 km from Kurnool and 210 km from Bengaluru which is the closest international airport.

Climate 
Anantapur has a semi-arid climate, with hot and dry conditions for most of the year. Summer start in late February and peak in May with average high temperatures around the  range. Anantapur gets pre-monsoon showers starting as early as March, mainly through north-easterly winds blowing in from Kerala. A dry and mild winter starts in late November and lasts until early February; with little humidity and average temperatures in the  range.

Demographics 

 census, Anantapur city has a population of 340,613. The sex ratio was 995 females per 1000 males and 9% of the population was under 6 years old. Effective literacy is 82%, male literacy is 89% and female literacy is 75%. Telugu is the official and widely spoken language, in addition to it Urdu, Hindi, Kannada and Tamil languages are also spoken by significant minorities in the city.

Governance 

Civic administration

Anantapuru Municipal Corporation is the civic body of Anantapuru.

Public utilities

Anantapuru Drinking Water Supply Project and Sri Sathya Sai Central Trust have also step forward in supplying clean water and concentrated mainly on eradicating fluorosis. The corporation supplies chlorinated water to the city from the summer storage tank located in the town.

Transport 

Anantapur is well connected to the nearby major cities with National Highway 44 and National Highway 205 of National Highway network of India. The NH–44 connects it to Bangalore, which is towards south and Hyderabad, towards north, and NH 205 connects it to Chennai via Renigunta. The Andhra Pradesh State Road Transport Corporation operates bus services from Anantapur bus station. The city has a total road length of 298.12 km.

 provides rail connectivity for the city and is classified as an A–category station in Guntakal railway division of South Central Railway zone.
The nearest International airport is Kempegowda International Airport, Bengaluru which is 190 kilometers away.

Culture 
There are a few notable people from the town with their contributions to various fields such as politics, film industry and other areas. Neelam Sanjiva Reddy was the former President of India and the first Chief Minister of Andhra Pradesh, and Paidi Lakshmayya was the first member of Parliament from Anantapur's Lok Sabha Constituency. Kallur Subba Rao was an Indian freedom activist and was the first speaker of Andhra Assembly, as well as Kadiri Venkata Reddy, who was an Indian film director, writer and also a producer. Sathya Sai Baba, was a Hindu spiritual leader; Bellary Raghava was an Indian playwright, thespian and film actor.

Cuisine 

Millets such as, Jowar,  Bajra,  Ragi are the food grains which are mostly used in food items. Peanuts are also popular and used in everyday food like chutney, Chikki and enjoyed as snack with boiled or spicy roasted peanuts.

Cityscape 

Neighbourhoods and landmarks in and around the city are - Clock tower, Sapthagiri circle, ISKCON temple, the railway station area, bus station, Srikantam circle,
Government Hospital, Court Road etc.
Major landmark of city is railway overbridge near Clock tower connecting Newtown constructed in late 1960. As part of connecting heart of city with NH44 this landmark is in demolition and closed till new four-lane flyover is functional.

Education 
The primary and secondary education is imparted by government, aided and private schools of the School Education Department of the state. The mediums of instruction that are followed by different CBSE schools like Kendriya Vidyalaya and Montessori Elite EM School, State board  English mediums and Telugu mediums.

Anantapur is an important education centre of the district which has many schools, colleges and universities. Prominent institutions and universities include, Sri Krishnadevaraya University, JNTU Anantapur, Sri Sathya Sai University, central University of Andhra Pradesh, Government Medical College, Arts College, PVKK Institute of Technology etc.

Sports 
Anantapur has many sports facilities and hosted the Irani Cup in 1963–64 when Rest of India scored their lowest total of 83 against the then Ranji trophy winners Bombay, played at the Sanjeeva Reddy stadium. Several Ranji trophy matches and other regional tournaments for basketball, badminton, etc. have been hosted in Anantapur.

The Anantapur Sports Village (ASV), located alongside the National Highway 7. The Anantapur Cricket Ground sits within a  complex which is managed by the Rural Development Trust (RDT). In October 2010, Rafael Nadal opened the Rafael Nadal Tennis School, which hosts district, state and national-level tournaments, as well as laying equal emphasis on the children's education and tennis training.
There are several Indoor Stadiums for Basketball and Badminton under local bodies which conducts District, State and National Competitions. There are many coaching class for taekwondo and Karate. There are also coaching centres for swimming which conduct district competitions.

Temples 
There are four temples under the management of Endowments Department.

 Sri Kasivisweswara & Kodanda Rama Swamy Temples
 Sri Virupakeshwara & Obuleswara Swamy Temple
 Sri Peta Basaveswara Swamy Temple
 Sri Rama Swamy temple
And there are several important Temples which became good landmarks such as
 ISKCON temple
 Sri Mounagiri Kshetram (39ft height Monolithic Hanuman statue)
 Shivakoti temple
 Harihara Temple
 Sri Anjanayaswamy Temple

Hospitals
 MGB Clinics
 KIMS- Saveera hospital
 Anantapur Government hospital
 Super Specialty hospital

See also 
 Havaligi
 List of Urban Agglomerations in Andhra Pradesh
 List of municipal corporations in Andhra Pradesh
 List of tourist attractions in Anantapur district

References

External links 

 
 Anatapur district

 
Cities in Andhra Pradesh
District headquarters of Andhra Pradesh
Cities and towns in Anantapur district